This article contains a list of the flags and/or modifications made on the flags of current sovereign nations.

Sovereign states

States with limited recognition

Dependent territories

See also
 Timeline of national independence
 Timeline of U.S. state flags
 List of sovereign states by date of current flag adoption

References

 
 
History of flags